Kathryn Crawford ( Moran; October 5, 1908 – December 7, 1980) was an American film and theatre actress of the 1920s and 1930s. She was also known as Katherine Crawford and Kitty Moran.

Early years
Born in Wellsboro, Pennsylvania, Crawford was the daughter of Michael and Ann (Scott) Moran. Her father worked in a glass factory. Her parents divorced when Crawford was 5 years old, and she did not see her mother again for nearly four decades.

Soon after Crawford's mother fell ill, her father moved the family to Los Angeles, California. She didn't get along with her stepmother, and at the age of 15, Crawford eloped with her sister's boyfriend to get out of the house. After a year and a half of marriage, the two separated. Her mother, who later remarried and was working as a hotel maid, searched 12 years for her daughters and found them after she saw Kathryn in a movie magazine in 1929.

Crawford first ventured into singing when she joined the choir at St. Stephen's Episcopal Church of Huntington Park while she was a high school student. The choir director gave her vocal lessons to improve her singing.

Career
Crawford worked as a shop assistant for some time but was determined to make use of her singing voice and decided to pursue musical comedy. Her first acting opportunity came in Lillian Albertson's production of The Love Call. She began performing in summer stock jobs across the Pacific Coast until she finally got her big break, as the ingenue in the play Hit the Deck. The play was successful and she attracted the attention of director Wesley Ruggles, who gave her a screen test that won her a contract with Universal Pictures.

Crawford starred in her first film in 1929 when she appeared opposite Hoot Gibson in King of the Rodeo. She would star in seven films that year, and in 1930 she appeared in another six films, including Safety in Numbers (1930) alongside Carole Lombard and up and coming actress and "WAMPAS Baby Star" Josephine Dunn.

Her only starring role on Broadway was in the Cole Porter musical The New Yorkers in which she was the original singer of "Love for Sale". The song was controversial because it was "sung from the perspective of a Prohibition-era prostitute." Ted Gioia wrote in the book The Jazz Standards: A Guide to the Repertoire, "audience outrage subsided after the Broadway production shifted the setting of the song to Harlem, in front of the Cotton Club, and assigned the number to African-American vocalist Elisabeth Welch instead of Kathryn Crawford, a white singer." However, by 1931 her career had cooled. She would star in only one film that year, and only three between 1932 and 1933, only one of which would be a starring lead role.

Crawford's final acting part came in 1941 when she was credited under the name "Katherine Crawford" in City of Missing Girls, and which starred H. B. Warner and John Archer. She retired from acting after that film, and moved to Pasadena, California.

Personal life
Crawford's initial marriage, when she eloped, was to Max Rogers, a student at UCLA. They were married by a justice of the peace in Riverside, set up housekeeping, and continued their high school and college educations. Crawford later said, "He didn't trust me and I didn't trust him." Crawford had the marriage annulled when she was 18.

On November 10, 1934, she married James Edgar, Jr., in Detroit, Michigan, and retired from the screen. They divorced (with much publicity) on June 16, 1936. Crawford married Ralph M. Parson, with whom she would remain married until his death in 1974.

In her later years, Crawford was an interior decorator for 40 years. Her clients included Barron Hilton (at Hilton's Jay Paley House), Douglas MacArthur, Herbert Hoover, and Mary Pickford's Pickfair estate.

Civic activities in which Crawford was active included Friends of Harvey Mudd College, Los Angeles Music Center, the Blue Ribbon 400, the Society for Preservation of Variety Arts, the Los Angeles County Museum, and the Society of American Interior Designers.

Death
Crawford died of cancer at the Las Encinas Hospital in Pasadena, California, on December 7, 1980. She was 72 years old.

References

Newspaper reports
St Joseph Gazette: 12-year search for girls ends, June 3, 1929
Los Angeles Times: Actress' Mother in Court Today, February 2, 1931.

External links

 

1908 births
1980 deaths
Burials at Forest Lawn Memorial Park (Glendale)
American film actresses
Actresses from Pennsylvania
People from Wellsboro, Pennsylvania
Deaths from cancer in California
20th-century American actresses